Sudek may refer to:

Josef Sudek, Czech photographer
Sudek peak, one of the five major peaks of Mount Elgon, located in Kenya
4176 Sudek, asteroid

See also
Saudek